Anne Petrie (born December 24, 1946) is a broadcaster and was most known as the host of Canada Live and Coast to Coast on CBC Newsworld during its early years. Prior to that she was the primary news anchor and host of CBWT's 24Hours LateNight from October 1985 to July 1989.

She has written several books. She has also hosted Anne Petrie's Talk TV and Absolutely Canadian, both on CBC Newsworld, and The Moral Divide, a co-production with VisionTV.

She is the daughter of actress Doris Petrie.

Publications
Ethnic Vancouver
Vancouver Secrets
More Vancouver Secrets
A guidebook to ethnic Vancouver : walking, shopping, and eating tours of the ethnic neighborhoods of Vancouver
Gone to an Aunt's: Remembering Canada's Homes for Unwed Mothers.

References

External links
 Library of Congress - Anne Petrie bio

Canadian television news anchors
Living people
1946 births
Canadian women television journalists
CBC Television people
20th-century Canadian journalists
21st-century Canadian journalists
20th-century Canadian women